The 1961 Kansas City Athletics season was a season in American baseball. In their seventh season in Kansas City, the 61st overall for the franchise, the A's finished with a record of 61–100, tying the expansion Washington Senators for ninth place, last in the newly expanded 10-team American League, 47½ games behind the World Champion New York Yankees.

Offseason 
On December 19, 1960, Charles "Charlie O." Finley purchased a controlling interest in the team from Arnold Johnson's estate. In a highly publicized move, he purchased a bus, pointed it in the direction of New York, and burned it to symbolize the end of the "special relationship" with the Yankees. He called another press conference to burn the existing lease at Municipal Stadium, where the team played its home games, which included the despised "escape clause."

Finley made numerous renovations to the stadium, including lighting outside, and radio broadcasts in the restrooms. The seats were painted yellow, turquoise and orange, while a picnic area was added behind new bleacher seats in right field, and lights were added to the dugout.

In addition, Finley introduced new uniforms, which had "Kansas City" on the road uniforms for the first time ever and an interlocking "KC" on the cap.

Notable transactions 
 January 24, 1961: Whitey Herzog and Russ Snyder were traded by the Athletics to the Baltimore Orioles for Bob Boyd, Al Pilarcik, Jim Archer, Wayne Causey, and Clint Courtney. Clint Courtney was returned to the Orioles on April 14.

Regular season 
Finley hired Frank Lane, a veteran baseball man with a reputation as a prolific trader, as general manager on January 2. However, Lane did not even last through the season, as he was fired on August 22 and replaced by Pat Friday.

Part of the tension between Finley and Lane occurred when Finley advised Lane that he wanted to move the club's spring training facilities from West Palm Beach, Florida, to Chandler, Arizona. Lane had negotiated with city officials in Chandler and was prepared to sign a lease. A report on the radio had indicated that Finley reached his own deal with West Palm Beach and signed a five-year lease extension.
On June 14, 1961, the feud between Charlie Finley and Frank Lane worsened as Lane traded fan favourite Bud Daley. Lane stated this was done in an attempt to embarrass the owner. Lew Krausse Jr. made his major league debut on June 16, 1961, versus the Los Angeles Angels. Krausse had received a bonus of $125,000 to sign with the club. Finley admitted that he had the highly touted Krausse appear in a game so that fans could forget about the Bud Daley trade.
August 17, 1961: Kansas City Star sportswriter Ernie Mehl had published a story indicating that Charlie Finley was ready to relocate the club to Dallas, Texas. Mehl found out about the proposed relocation because Finley went on a trip to Dallas with the supervisor of American League umpires Cal Hubbard. During the trip, the two visited the Cotton Bowl and Burnett Field. Finley was furious and it led to a long rivalry between the two. Three days later, Finley attempted to publicly humiliate Mehl by having an Ernie Mehl Appreciation Day. Ceremonies for Mehl were held in between a doubleheader with the Chicago White Sox. Finley presented Mehl with a Poison Pen Award in absentia.

Gimmicks
Finley had a mechanical rabbit named Harvey installed to the right of home plate. Whenever the umpire required more baseballs, Harvey would emerge from a spot in the grass with a cage of baseballs. As the rabbit would emerge, the organist would play Here Comes Peter Cottontail.
Sheep were on a tall rocky hill beyond the right field fence. Finley had employees dressed as sheep herders, and the employees would ring a bell whenever an Athletics player hit a home run.

Season standings

Record vs. opponents

Notable transactions 
 April 25, 1961: Bert Campaneris was signed as an amateur free agent by the Athletics.
 June 1, 1961: Bill Tuttle and a player to be named later were traded by the Athletics to the Minnesota Twins for Reno Bertoia, Paul Giel and a player to be named later. The Athletics completed the deal by returning Paul Giel to the Twins in exchange for cash on June 10.
 June 8, 1961: Marv Throneberry was traded by the Athletics to the Baltimore Orioles for Gene Stephens.
 June 10, 1961: Ray Herbert, Don Larsen, Andy Carey, and Al Pilarcik were traded by the Athletics to the Chicago White Sox for Wes Covington, Stan Johnson, Bob Shaw, and Gerry Staley.
 July 2, 1961: Wes Covington was traded by the Athletics to the Philadelphia Phillies for Bobby Del Greco.
 August 2, 1961: Gerry Staley and Reno Bertoia were traded by the Athletics to the Detroit Tigers for Bill Fischer and Ozzie Virgil.

Roster

Player stats

Batting

Starters by position 
Note: Pos = Position; G = Games played; AB = At bats; H = Hits; Avg. = Batting average; HR = Home runs; RBI = Runs batted in

Other batters 
Note: G = Games played; AB = At bats; H = Hits; Avg. = Batting average; HR = Home runs; RBI = Runs batted in

Pitching

Starting pitchers 
Note: G = Games pitched; IP = Innings pitched; W = Wins; L = Losses; ERA = Earned run average; SO = Strikeouts

Other pitchers 
Note: G = Games pitched; IP = Innings pitched; W = Wins; L = Losses; ERA = Earned run average; SO = Strikeouts

Relief pitchers 
Note: G = Games pitched; W = Wins; L = Losses; SV = Saves; ERA = Earned run average; SO = Strikeouts

Farm system

References

External links
1961 Kansas City Athletics team page at Baseball Reference
1961 Kansas City Athletics team page at www.baseball-almanac.com

Oakland Athletics seasons
Kansas City Athletics season
1961 in sports in Missouri